Frenda is a town and commune in Tiaret Province in northwestern Algeria. It is best known for ancient Berber monumental tombs known as Jedars.

Notable people
 Larbi Belkheir - Algerian politician
 Abdelkader Benayada - Algerian association football player
 Benhalima Rouane - Algerian association football player
 Edgar Stoëbel - French painter

References

Communes of Tiaret Province